Sky West and Crooked (known in the United States as Gypsy Girl) is a 1966 British romantic drama film starring Hayley Mills. The film was directed by her father, John Mills, and was co-written by her mother, Mary Hayley Bell.

The title derives from a West Country term for someone who is "not quite right in the head".

Plot

In a small, isolated village on the West side of England, seven-year-old Brydie White is running with a playmate, Julian, who trips and falls. He is accidentally killed by his father's loaded shotgun that he was playing with. Brydie is injured with a wound to her head causing some intellectual disability.

Seven years later, Brydie (Hayley Mills) can remember the boy but cannot remember the accident. She regularly visits Julian's grave but is not sure why she does. She has an argument with the old gravedigger who aggressively tells her that her dog is not allowed in the graveyard. She is rescued by a young man (Ian McShane) whom the old man calls a "gypo" and a "tinker".

Her mother (Annette Crosbie, in her first film role) is a sad and lonely person who drinks heavily and is a dysfunctional mother. Brydie is a tomboy with a fascination for death and dead animals, and spends her time climbing trees and being a nuisance to the adults in the small village where she lives. She spends much of her time with the local children and tells them that all dead things should be buried, including animals. They agree to go round the village collecting up all the dead animals they can find and plan to bury them all in the graveyard that night.

It becomes apparent that some of the adults, especially the dead boy's father who blames Brydie for his death and has never forgiven her for it, are convinced that Brydie is a bad influence on the other children, that something should be done to discipline her and agree that her mother is not a good role model and to be looked down upon. Their negative attitude and behaviour are compounded by their disapproval that her mother was not married to Brydie's late father. The Vicar wakes the next morning to find his graveyard full of little graves the children have made to bury the animals and tries to explain to Brydie that because they have no souls, they cannot be buried on consecrated ground but understanding her simplicity and good intentions asks Julian's father if he would give a small corner of his land to the children to have their own animal graveyard. However, the father is embittered and he confronts her, accusing her of murdering Julian seven years earlier. Horrified and scared that it might be true, she runs in a fit of hysteria and falls in the river where she is rescued by the gypsy boy, Roibin. When he carries her into the nearby gypsy camp, his grandmother says "you can't keep away from women, can you?".

The gypsy's do not want her there, knowing that it will only bring trouble and Roibin has a reputation for trouble but seeing the fevered state of Brydie, the Grandmother takes her in and, begrudgingly, nurses her well. During the weeks Brydie is away, her mum drinks more heavily, distraught over Brydie's disappearance. She has a heart attack and dies. The Police interview the gypsies but they deny knowledge of the girl. When police dogs are brought in they lead police to the river edge and the worst is feared.

As Brydie recovers, she and Roibin become close and he helps her to face and talk about what happened with Julian. He asks her to stay with him and the gypsies when they move on. She says that she couldn't leave her mother and needs to go home. He pledges his love for her and they kiss in a meadow.  The village children find them there and tell her that her mother died during her absence. Upset, she decides to go to see her mother's grave and realising that she has nothing to stay home for, promises to return to Roibin. He teaches her how to read sticks that will tell her which direction the gypsies will have gone if they leave before she gets back. She shares a final kiss with Roibin and leaves with the children.

The children run to tell the Vicar that Brydie is at her mothers grave and he gathers her up and takes her to his house promising to look after her. Brydie insists that she must return to Roibin as she has nothing to stay for and the Vicar promises to tell Roibin to come and collect Brydie in the morning as she is still unwell, exhausted and needs a good nights sleep. Relieved, Brydie falls asleep while the Vicar asks the gravedigger to go the gypsy camp and tell Roibin to come and get Brydie in the morning.

He goes but tells the gypsies to leave immediately as they are unwanted and threatens to call the Police to arrest them for kidnapping Brydie. They are angry at this and begin to pack up straight away. Roibin tries to make the gypsies stay until Brydie returns so that she can go with them but they attack him, blaming him for this unwanted trouble, they do not want her with them and Roibin is beaten up.

By late morning, the vicar is convinced that Roibin is not coming and agrees with his wife that Brydie will probably be institutionalised. Brydie convinces the Vicar that Roibin loves her and shows him a special token that Roibin made for her of their hair intertwined into an eternal ring. The vicar and Brydie (and her dog) go to the campsite and find it abandoned "like they were never here" (apart from piles of rubbish and debris). Brydie finds and follows a series of directional marker sticks left by Roibin at junctions. The Vicar follows her to make sure she is safe. She is just beginning to think that she has lost the trail when she hears the barking of another dog and sees a solitary gypsy caravan in a field. Knowing that it is Roibin, she runs to it. The vicar watches as Roibin runs to greet Brydie knowing that this is the right life and future for her.

Cast
 Hayley Mills as Brydie White
 Mandy Woollen as Brydie as a child
 Andrew Wicks as Julian Dacres
 Ian McShane as Roibin Krisenki, the gypsy boy
 Annette Crosbie as Mrs. White, Brydie's mother
 Laurence Naismith as Edwin Dacres
 Geoffrey Bayldon as Reverend Phillip Moss
 Pauline Jameson as Mrs. Moss
 Norman Bird as Mr. Cheeseman - undertaker
 June Ellis as Mrs. Cheeseman
 Hamilton Dyce as Bill Slim - grave digger
 Judith Furse as Mrs. Rigby
 Anne Blake as Mrs. Potts
 Jack Bligh as Fred Strong
 Michael Nightingale as Doctor
 Dafydd Havard as Schoolmaster
 Jacqueline Pearce as Camellia
 Alan Lake as Camlo
 Wyn Jones as Miller
 Cyril Chamberlain as Hubbard
 George Selway as Police Sergeant
 Fred Ferris as Police Constable
 Grace Arnold, Margaret Lacey and Kay Lyell as Village Women
 Rachel Thomas as gypsy Grandmam
 Jabal Jones as Gerald Lawson
 Irene Bradshaw as Rachel
 Talfryn Thomas as Brand
 Hira Talfrey as Blossom
 Richard Davies as Rick
 Len Jones as Dusty
 Roland Starling as Harry
 Jessica Hobbs as Cathy
 Susan Chatham as Susie
 Robin Crewe as Chalky
 Lola Payne as Biddie
 Nicola Street as Nell
 Stephen Salt as Jakey
 Joyce Mayhead as Emm
 Anne Somerset as Girl in Church
 Catriona Street as Gypsy Girl

Production
During pre production the film was known as Bats With Baby Faces based on a line from a T.S. Eliot poem.

Filming locations
The film was shot on location in and around the village of Little Badminton in South Gloucestershire.

Reception
According to one review, "It was an attempt to recapture some of the magic of Whistle Down the Wind, but all the chips have to fall the right way for these sort of movies to work (i.e. sensitive character pieces) and it didn’t happen; this isn’t a bad picture, just not a particularly good one."

References

External links
 
 

1966 films
1966 romantic drama films
British romantic drama films
Films about intellectual disability
Films directed by John Mills
Films shot at Pinewood Studios
Films set in England
Films scored by Malcolm Arnold
1960s English-language films
1960s British films